The 2016–17 Scottish League Cup final was the 71st final of the Scottish League Cup and took place on 27 November 2016 at Hampden Park, Glasgow. The clubs contesting the final were Aberdeen and Celtic, with Celtic winning 3–0. It was their 16th League Cup triumph and the 100th major trophy in their history.

This was the second Scottish League Cup final played in 2016, as the 2015–16 competition was concluded in March and since the 2016–17 season the competition was completed in the first half of the season.

Route to the final

As both clubs participated in European competitions, they both received a bye through the 2016–17 Scottish League Cup group stage.

Aberdeen

Aberdeen were seeded for the second round draw and were drawn to face Group G runners-up Ayr United away from home on 10 August. The away side took an early lead after a Daryll Meggatt own goal. Niall McGinn doubled the lead midway through the first half before Alan Forrest brought Ayr back into the game just before half-time. The Dons survived a late onslaught from the Honest Men to advance with a 2–1 win.

From the quarter-finals onwards there was no seeding and Aberdeen were drawn at home to fellow Premiership side St Johnstone on 22 September. Another nervy encounter followed as the Dons required a last-minute Adam Rooney goal to win 1–0.

Aberdeen were drawn to face Championship side Greenock Morton in the semi-finals at Hampden Park on 22 October. The Dons hadn't won a match at the National Stadium for 16 years but goals from Rooney and Kenny McLean in a game Aberdeen dominated saw them into the final.

Celtic

Celtic were seeded for the second round draw and were drawn at home to face Group F runners-up Motherwell on 10 August. The home side dominated the match, with 65% possession and 26 shots, 16 on target to Motherwell's 4 off target shots. Moussa Dembélé and Tom Rogic score twice with Scott Sinclair also scoring as Celtic won 5–0.

Celtic were given another home draw to Alloa Athletic in the quarter-finals on 21 September. The League One side proved to be stubborn outfit but late goals from James Forrest and Dembélé saw Celtic through with a 2–0 win.

Celtic were drawn to play archrivals Rangers in the semi-final at Hampden Park on 26 October. The last time the two sides met in the League Cup was a 2–0 Celtic win at this stage in 2015. This time, Celtic required a late Dembélé goal to see off their Old Firm rivals despite dominating the match.

Match

Summary
In the 16th minute of the match Tom Rogic cut in form the right and shot left footed from just inside the penalty area into the left corner of the net to give Celtic the lead. It was 2-0 in the 37th minute when James Forrest picked up the ball in the centre of the pitch and ran at the Aberdeen defence before scoring with a low right footed shot from inside the penalty area.
In the 64th minute James Forrest was brought down in the penalty area by Anthony O'Connor, with Moussa Dembélé scoring the resulting penalty with a low shot to the right corner to make it 3-0.

Details

See also
Played between same teams:
2017 Scottish Cup Final 
2018 Scottish League Cup final

References

External links

2016 November
2
Aberdeen F.C. matches
Celtic F.C. matches
2010s in Glasgow
Sports competitions in Glasgow
November 2016 sports events in the United Kingdom
League Cup final